The CSV qualification for the 2010 FIVB Volleyball Men's World Championship saw member nations compete for two places at the finals in Italy.

Draw
8 of the 12 CSV national teams entered qualification. The teams were distributed according to their position in the FIVB Senior Men's Rankings as of 5 January 2008 using the serpentine system for their distribution. (Rankings shown in brackets)

Third round

Third round

Pool A
Venue:  Polideportivo Ave Fénix, San Luis, Argentina
Dates: August 28–30, 2009
All times are Argentina Time (UTC−03:00)

|}

|}

Pool B
Venue:  Domo Olímpico, Guárico, Venezuela
Dates: August 10–12, 2009
All times are Venezuelan Standard Time (UTC−04:30)

|}

|}

References

External links
 2010 World Championship Qualification

2010 FIVB Volleyball Men's World Championship
2009 in volleyball
FIVB Volleyball World Championship qualification